Andrew Stephen Gordon-Saker (born 4 October 1958) is a British Costs Judge who has been Senior Costs Judge (Chief Taxing Master) since 1 October 2014.

He was educated at Stonyhurst College and the University of East Anglia (LLB, 1980). He was called to the bar at Middle Temple in 1981, and served as a Conservative Party councillor on Camden London Borough Council from 1982 to 1986 for the Bloomsbury ward.

Family
He is married to Liza Gordon-Saker (born 30 November 1959), a British Circuit Judge.

References

1958 births
Living people
People educated at Stonyhurst College
Alumni of the University of East Anglia
Members of the Middle Temple
Conservative Party (UK) councillors
Councillors in the London Borough of Camden
Masters of the High Court (England and Wales)